Electrical wiring in North America follows the regulations and standards applicable at the installation location. It is also designed to provide proper function, and is also influenced by history and traditions of the location installation. 

The US National Electrical Code is applicable to many areas in the US where state, county or local authorities have adopted it. For electrical wiring in Canada, the Canadian Electrical Code is a very similar standard published in Canada by the Canadian Standards Association.

Terminology
Although much of the electrician's field terminology matches that of the electrical codes, usages can vary:
 Neutral wire is the return conductor of a circuit; in building wiring systems, the neutral wire is connected to earth ground at only one point. North American standards state that the neutral is neither switched nor fused except in very narrowly defined circumstances. The neutral is connected to the center tap of the power company transformer of a split-phase system, or the center of the wye connection of a polyphase power system.
United States electrical codes require that the neutral be connected to earth at the "service panel" only and at no other point within the building wiring system. Formally, the neutral is called the "grounded conductor"; as of the 2008 NEC, the terms "neutral conductor" and "neutral point" have been defined in the Code to conform to what had been common usage.
 Hot is any line or neutral conductor (wire or otherwise) connected with an electrical system that has electric potential relative to electrical ground or line to neutral.
 Ground is a safety conductor with a low impedance path to earth. It is often called the "ground wire," or safety ground. It is either bare or has green insulation.
 Leg as in "hot leg" refers to one of multiple hot conductors in an electrical system. The most common residential and small commercial service in Canada and the U.S., single split-phase, 240 V, features a neutral and two hot legs, 240 V to each other, and 120 V each to the neutral. The most common three-phase system will have three hot legs, 208 V to each other and 120 V each to the neutral. An older, but still widely used high-leg delta system uses three phases with 240 volts phase-to-phase for motor loads, and 120 volts for lighting loads by use of a center-tapped transformer; two of the phases are 120 volts to neutral. The third phase, the "high leg" of the system (also referred to as the "wild leg"), has 208 V to neutral and is not usually used for single-phase connections, so is distinctively colored. For larger commercial installations, 277/480 V or 347/600 V three phase is common.
An outlet is defined by the NEC as "a point in the wiring system at which current is taken to utilization equipment". This definition includes receptacles, lighting, motors, etc. Ordinary switches control but do not consume electricity, and therefore are not defined as outlets in this sense.

Electrical codes and standards
The National Electrical Code (NEC) specifies minimum acceptable wiring methods and materials for many states and municipalities in the U.S. It is sponsored by the National Fire Protection Association (NFPA) and has been periodically revised since 1897. Local jurisdictions usually adopt the NEC or another published code and then distribute documents describing how local codes vary from the published codes.  Governments cannot distribute the NEC itself for copyright reasons, though parts that have been adopted into law are not subject to copyright.

The purpose of the NEC is to protect persons and property from hazards arising from the use of electricity.  The NEC is not any jurisdiction's electrical code per se; rather, it is an influential work of standards that local legislators (e.g., city council members, state legislators, etc. as appropriate) tend to use as a guide when enacting local electrical codes. The NFPA states that excerpts quoted from the National Electrical Code must have a disclaimer indicating that the excerpt is not the complete and authoritative position of the NFPA and that the original NEC document must be consulted as the definitive reference.

New construction, additions or major modifications must follow the relevant code for that jurisdiction, which is not necessarily the latest version of the NEC. Regulations in each jurisdiction will indicate when a change to an existing installation is so great that it must then be rebuilt to comply with the current electrical code. Generally existing installations are not required to be changed to meet new codes.

Other code requirements vary by jurisdiction in the United States. In many areas, a homeowner, for example, can perform household wiring for a building which the owner occupies; this may even be complete wiring of a home. A few cities have more restrictive rules and require electrical installations to be done by licensed electricians. The work will be inspected by a designated authority at several stages before permission is obtained to energize the wiring from the local electric utility; the inspector may be an employee of the state or city, or an employee of an electrical supply utility.

For electrical wiring in Canada, the Canadian Electrical Code is a very similar standard published in Canada by the Canadian Standards Association since 1927.

Design and installation conventions 
For residential wiring, some basic rules given in the NEC are:

Terminals for the neutral (grounded) conductor in general, and for receptacles, plugs, and connectors specifically, are required to be substantially white in color [NEC 200.9, NEC 200.10 (B)], and if the terminal itself is not visible, the hole leading to it must be marked with the word "white" or the letter "W". Edison-base lamp sockets (called screw shell devices in the NEC) are required to have the neutral conductor attached to the outer screw shell [NEC 200.10(C)]. In actual practice, the neutral terminal is silver colored, the line and load terminals are brass or (rarely) painted black), and the grounding screw is usually colored green. A common mnemonic electricians use to remember which wire goes to which terminal is "white to light…black to brass…green to green".
Phase wire in a circuit may be any color other than green, gray, or white (whether these are solid colors or stripes). The common colors are black, red, blue, brown, yellow, and orange (high leg delta) insulated wire, sometimes other colors.  Specific exceptions apply, such as a cable running to a switch and back (known as a traveler) where the white wire will be the hot wire feeding that switch.  Another is for a cable used to feed an outlet for 250 VAC appliances that do not need a neutral, there the white is hot. In both those instances the white wire should be identified as being hot, usually with black tape inside junction boxes.
The neutral wire is identified by gray or white insulated wire, perhaps using stripes or markings.
With lamp cord wire the ribbed wire is the neutral, and the smooth wire is the hot. NEC 2008 400.22(f) allows surface marking with ridged, grooves or white stripes on the surface of lamp cord.  With transparent cord the hot wire is copper colored, and the neutral is silver colored.
Grounding wire of circuit may be bare or identified insulated wire of green or green having yellow stripes. All metallic systems in a building are to be bonded to the building grounding system, such as water, natural gas, HVAC piping, and others.
Larger wires are generally furnished only in black; these black wires may be properly re-identified with suitable paint or tape.
All wiring in a circuit except for the leads that are part of a device or fixture must be of the required gauge or larger.  Different size wires may be used in the same raceway so long as they are all insulated for the maximum voltage of any of these circuits.
 The Code gives rules for calculating circuit loading and maximum ampacity.
Ground-fault circuit interrupter (GFCI) protection is required on receptacles in wet locations and locations where there exists an easy path for fault current to travel to earth. This includes all receptacles intended to service kitchen counter surfaces), crawl spaces at or below grade level, basements, garages and accessory buildings, bathrooms, laundry areas, within 6 ft. of the outside edge of a sink bathtub or shower stall, as well as outdoors. There were previous exceptions for refrigerators because unattended disconnection could cause spoilage of food and for garbage disposals.  Instead, for refrigerators and other semi-permanent appliances in basements and wet areas, a one-outlet non-GFCI dedicated receptacle was generally used. As of the 2020 NEC this exception no longer exists and those devices in are required to have GFCI protection where otherwise required. Two-wire outlets having no grounding conductor may be protected by a GFCI or one upstream of the receptacle and must be labelled "No Equipment Ground" and "GFCI Protected". Most GFCI receptacles allow the connection and provide GFCI protection for down-stream connected receptacles.  Receptacles protected in this manner or with a GFCI circuit breaker should be labeled "GFCI protected".  (Outside North America these are referred to as  a "Residual-current device" or RCD.)
Arc-Fault Circuit Interrupter (AFCI) protection is required to protect nearly all finished areas of a home with the exception of bathrooms. This device, which can be a circuit breaker or the first outlet on a circuit, is designed to detect hazardous electrical arcing in the branch circuit wiring as well as in cords and plugs. An AFCI device is designed to trip quickly when it detects potentially dangerous arcing that could start a fire, but not trip with harmless arcing as part of the normal operation of devices such as motors.
Most circuits have the metallic components interconnected with a grounding wire connected to the third, round prong of a plug, and to metal boxes and appliance chassis.
Furnaces, electric water heaters, heat pumps, central air conditioning units, electric dryers, electric stoves or cooktops, and built in microwave ovens must be on dedicated circuits.
The code provides rules for sizing electrical boxes for the number of wires and wiring devices in the box.

The foregoing is just a brief overview and must not be used as a substitute for the actual National Electrical Code.

Comparison of US practices with other countries

Electrical wiring practices developed in parallel in many countries  in the late 19th and early 20th centuries. As a result, national and regional variations developed and remain in effect. (see National Electrical Code, electrical wiring, electrical wiring in the United Kingdom).  Some of these are retained for technical reasons, since the safety of wiring systems depends not only on the wiring code but also on the technical standards for wiring devices, materials, and equipment.

Grounding (earthing) of distribution circuits is a notable difference in practice between wiring systems of the United States and those of other regions. Since the early 1960s, wiring in new construction has required a separate grounding conductor used to bond (electrically connect) all normally non-current carrying parts of an electrical installation. Portable appliances with metal cases also have a bonding conductor in the flexible cable and plug connecting them to the distribution system. The circuit return conductor (neutral) is also connected to ground at the service entrance panel only; no other connections from neutral to ground are allowed, unlike regulations in some other parts of the world.

Lighting and power receptacle circuits in North American systems are typically radial from a distribution panel containing circuit breakers to protect each branch circuit. The smallest branch circuit rating is 15 amperes, used for general purpose receptacles and lighting. Often, 20 ampere circuits are used for general purpose receptacles and lighting. In residential construction, branch circuits for higher ratings are usually dedicated to one appliance, for example, fixed cooking appliances, electric clothes dryers, and air conditioners. Lighting and general purpose receptacles are at 120 volts AC, with larger devices fed by three wire single-phase circuits at 240 volts. 

In commercial construction, three-phase circuits are often used. Common 3 phase configurations within a building are 208v/120 wye, 120/240 center tapped delta and 480v/277v wye.  Lighting is usually fed by 277 V or 120v. 

Countries such as Mexico may adopt the NFPA standard as their  national electrical code, with local amendments similar to those in United States jurisdictions. The Canadian Electrical Code, while developed independently from the NFPA code, is similar in scope and intent to the US NEC, with only minor variations in technical requirement details; harmonization of the CEC and NEC codes is intended to facilitate free trade between the two countries.

Wiring methods 

Most circuits in the modern North American home and light commercial construction are wired with non-metallic sheathed (NM) cable designated type.   This type of cable is the least expensive for a given size and is appropriate for dry indoor applications.  The designation NM XX-Y indicates, respectively, the type of sheathing (in this case, non-metallic), the size of the main conductors, and the total number of circuit conductors (exclusive of the grounding conductor).  For example, NM 14-2 cable contains three conductors (two plus one ground) at 14 gauge, a size typically used for circuits protected at 15 amperes.  Circuits with larger currents (such as for electric furnaces, water heaters, air conditioners, or sub-mains to additional circuit panels) will have larger conductors.  Not all US jurisdictions permit use of non-metallic sheathed cable. The NEC does not permit use of NM cable in large, fire-resistant, or high-rise structures.

In type NM cable, conductor insulation is color-coded for identification, typically one black, one white, and a bare grounding conductor. The National Electrical Code (NEC) specifies that the black conductor represent the hot conductor, with significant voltage to earth ground; the white conductor represent the identified or neutral conductor, near ground potential; and the bare/green conductor, the safety grounding conductor not normally used to carry circuit current. Wires may be re-colored, so these rules are commonly excepted. In 240-volt applications not requiring a neutral conductor, the white wire may be used as the second hot conductor, but must be recolored with tape or by some other method.  Four-wire flexible equipment connection cords have red as the fourth color; unlike older European practices, color-coding in flexible cords is the same as for fixed wiring.

In commercial and industrial, unenclosed NM cable is often prohibited in certain areas or altogether (depending on what the building is used for and local/state building codes). Therefore, it is almost never used by commercial electrical contractors. Most wiring is put in non-flexible conduit, usually EMT because of its cost and durability. Rigid may be required for certain areas and additionally, vapor-lock fittings may be required in areas where a fire or explosion hazard is present (such as gas stations, chemical factories, grain silos, etc.) PVC can be used where wire is run underground or where concrete will be poured. A duct bank is usually made of multiple PVC conduits encased in concrete. FMC or Flex is used where EMT or other non-flexible conduit is impractical or for short runs, known as "whips", to lights or other devices. For power circuits, the color-coding uses the same colors as residential construction, and adds the additional wires used for three-phase systems. Black, Red and Blue are used for hot wires and White is used as the neutral wire in a 120/208 V circuit. Brown, Orange and Yellow are used as hot wires and gray is used as the neutral wire in a 277/480 V. For grounding, regardless of the voltage, Green (or a bare wire) is used.

Several other types of wiring systems are used for building wiring in the United States; these include corrugated metal armored cable, mineral-insulated cable, other types of power cable, and various types of electrical conduit. In industrial applications cables may be laid in cable trays. Cable type TC is especially intended for use in tray systems. Special wiring  rules apply to wet or corrosive locations, and to locations which present an explosion hazard. Wiring materials for use in the United States must generally be made and tested to product standards set by NEMA and Underwriters Laboratories (UL) and must bear approval marks such as those set by UL.

Approved wiring types can vary by jurisdiction.  Not all wiring methods approved in the NEC are accepted in all areas of the United States.

Wire types

Wire types for North American wiring practices are defined by standards issued by Underwriters Laboratories, the Canadian Standards Association, the American Society for Testing and Materials, the National Electrical Manufacturers Association, and the Insulated Cable Engineers Association.

XHHW stands for "XLPE (which itself is an abbreviation for cross(X)-linked polyethylene) High Heat-resistant Water-resistant." XHHW is a designation for a specific insulation material, temperature rating, and condition of use (suitable for wet locations) for electrical wire and cable.

Wires with XHHW insulation are commonly used in the alternating current (AC) electrical distribution systems of commercial, institutional, and industrial buildings and installations, usually at voltage levels (potential difference or electromotive force) ranging from 110-600 volts. This type of insulation is used for both copper and aluminum conductors  which are either solid or stranded, depending on size.

According to Underwriters Laboratories (UL) Standard 44, XHHW insulation is suitable for use in dry locations up to 90°C (194°F), or wet locations up to 75°C (167°F).

XHHW-2 insulation, which is similar to XHHW, is suitable for use in dry or wet locations up to 90°C (194°F).

THWN stands for "Thermoplastic Heat and Water-resistant Nylon-coated." THWN is a designation for a specific insulation material, temperature rating, and condition of use (wet locations) for electrical wire and cable.

THHN stands for "Thermoplastic High Heat-resistant Nylon-coated." THHN is a designation for a specific insulation material, temperature rating, and condition of use (suitable for dry and damp locations) for electrical wire and cable.

Wire with  THWN or THHN insulation is commonly used in the AC electrical distribution systems throughout North America, usually at voltage levels  from 110 to 600 volts. This type of insulation is used for both copper and aluminum conductors  which are either solid or stranded, depending on size. Many wires are rated both THWN and THHN, and are suitable for use in dry locations up to 90°C (194°F), or wet locations up to 75°C (167°F).

See also 
American wire gauge
Electrical wiring in the United Kingdom
Twist-on wire connector

References

External links 
 Wire and Cable Technical Information Handbook
 The NEC at NFPA.org
 Summary of NEC Color Code

Electrical wiring
Power cables
North America